Achim Steiner (born 17 May 1961) is a Brazilian-born environmentalist who currently serves as the administrator of the United Nations Development Programme and chairman of United Nations Sustainable Development Group.

Before joining UNDP, he was executive director of the United Nations Environment Programme UNEP (2006–2016), and director of the Oxford Martin School (2016–2017). He has also served as director general of the International Union for Conservation of Nature (IUCN) and secretary-general of the World Commission on Dams.

Early life and education
The son of a German farmer who had emigrated to Rio Grande do Sul, Achim Steiner was born in Brazil in 1961 and holds German as well as Brazilian citizenship. He went to school in Carazinho and at Dover College. He obtained a bachelor's degree from Worcester College of the University of Oxford and a master's degree from the School of Oriental and African Studies (SOAS) of the University of London, specializing in development economics, regional planning, international development and environmental policy. He also studied at the German Development Institute and the Harvard Business School.

Career
Steiner started his career in 1989 at the  Rural Regional Development Department, GIZ, in Germany.  From 1991 to 1997 he worked for the International Union for Conservation of Nature (IUCN) in Southern Africa and Washington, D.C. He was Chief Technical Adviser of the Mekong River Commission (1997–1998) before becoming Secretary-General of the World Commission on Dams. In 2001 he returned to IUCN as Director-General.

United Nations Environment Programme, 2006–2016
Acting on the nomination of Secretary-General Kofi Annan, the United Nations General Assembly in 2006 unanimously elected Steiner Executive Director of the United Nations Environment Programme (UNEP) for a four-year term. At the time, he was not nominated by a Member State, but prevailed over candidates such as Børge Brende of Norway and Rajendra K. Pachauri of India. His mandate was later extended twice, this time on the proposal of the Secretary-General Ban Ki-moon.

The Secretary-General appointed Steiner as director-general of the United Nations Office at Nairobi (UNON), where he served from March 2009 to May 2011. Within the UN system he also chaired the High-level Committee on Programmes of the United Nations System Chief Executives Board for Coordination  and the United Nations Environment Management Group. On 3 May 2016, Ban Ki-moon announced that the post of executive director of UNEP would be taken over by Erik Solheim in June 2016.

Oxford Martin School, 2016–2017
Upon leaving UNEP, Steiner was appointed director of the Oxford Martin School, a post he took up in September 2016. In addition to his role at the University of Oxford, Steiner was appointed Envoy of the Chair of the Platform on Disaster Displacement by the Federal Government of Germany in October 2016.

In late 2015, Reuters reported that Steiner was one of three candidates shortlisted to succeed António Guterres as United Nations High Commissioner for Refugees, alongside Helle Thorning-Schmidt of Denmark, Jasmine Whitbread of the United Kingdom, and Filippo Grandi of Italy; the post eventually went to Grandi.

United Nations Development Programme, 2017–present
In April 2017, following consultations with the executive board of the United Nations Development Programme (UNDP), Secretary-General António Guterres appointed Steiner as the programme's new Administrator. On 19 April 2017, the United Nations General Assembly confirmed him for a four-year term.

In November 2018, Guterres also appointed Steiner to co-chair (alongside Maria Ramos) the United Nations' Task Force on Digital Financing of Sustainable Development Goals.

Other activities
 Generation Unlimited, Member of the Board (since 2018)
 Joint United Nations Programme on HIV/AIDS (UNAIDS), Ex-Officio Member of the Committee of Cosponsoring Organizations (since 2017)
 International Gender Champions (IGC), Member (since 2017)
 OECD/UNDP Tax Inspectors Without Borders (TIWB), Co-chair of the Governing Board (since 2017)
 German Council for Sustainable Development (RNE), Member (2016–2017, appointed ad personam by Chancellor Angela Merkel)
 International Olympic Committee (IOC), Member of the Sustainability and Legacy Commission
 Agora Verkehrswende, Chairman of the Council 
 Platform on Disaster Displacement, Chair of the Advisory Committee
 China Council for International Cooperation on Environment and Development (CCICED), International Vice-chair
 Earth Day Network, Member of the Global Advisory Committee
 The Economics of Ecosystems and Biodiversity (TEEB), Member of the Advisory Board
 European Bank for Reconstruction and Development (EBRD), Member of the Environmental Advisory Council (ENVAC)

Honours and awards

Awards
 Slovak Republic's gold medal for Diplomatic Service
 Republic of Korea Order of Diplomatic Service Award
 2012 — The National German Sustainability Award
 2010 – Leadership Award for Principled Pragmatism – Tällberg Foundation
 2009 — Officer of the Order of Saint-Charles (Monaco)
 Shark Guardian of the Year 2008 – Shark Project
 2008 — Schubert Prize – Bruno H. Schubert Foundation 
 2007 — Steiger Award – Umwelt

Honorary degrees
 Honorary Doctorate, International University in Geneva (IUG)
 Honorary Professor, Tongji University, Shanghai

References

External links

 Interview with Achim Steiner
 Official website of UNEP
 Biography at Oxford Martin School

Living people
Brazilian officials of the United Nations
Alumni of SOAS University of London
Alumni of Worcester College, Oxford
Alumni of the University of London
Harvard Business School alumni
United Nations Environment Programme
People associated with the International Union for Conservation of Nature
1961 births
German officials of the United Nations